Syllepte albopunctum is a moth in the family Crambidae. It was described by Christian Guillermet in 1996. It is found on Réunion.

References

Moths described in 1996
albopunctum
Moths of Africa